James Fraser-Mackenzie (born May 17, 1993) is a Zimbabwean rower who competes primarily in the single sculls. Born in Harare, Zimbabwe, Fraser-Mackenzie started his sporting career as a middle-distance runner, and won junior cross-country events until he became more passionate with rowing. He is previously a member of St. George's College Boat Club, and currently trains at the Leander Club in Remenham.

Rowing career
In 2009, at age 16, Fraser-Mackenzie represented Zimbabwe at the World Rowing Junior Championships in Brive-la-Gaillarde, France, and competed with his partner Stephen Cox in the men's double sculls. He and Cox finished only in twentieth place, but were able to set a national record with a time of 6 minutes and 51 seconds. The following year, Fraser-Mackenzie competed once again at the 2010 World Rowing Junior Championships in Račice, and served as the captain of the national rowing team for Zimbabwe. He also competed at the 2011 South African Junior Championships, where he took two gold medals for both the single and double sculls. Fraser-Mackenzie continued to improve his personal best of 7 minutes and 2 seconds, by competing for his final year at the 2011 World Rowing Junior Championships in Eton Dorney, where he finished eight overall in the men's single sculls.

Olympics

2012 Summer Olympics
Fraser-Mackenzie made his debut at the 2012 Summer Olympics in London, after finishing second at the 2011 African Olympic Qualifying Regatta in Alexandria, Egypt. He was also one of the seven athletes who competed for the Zimbabwe team at these Olympic games, including swimmer and multiple medalist Kirsty Coventry.

At the Olympics, Fraser-Mackenzie finished penultimate in heat three of the men's single sculls at a time of 7:16.83, and thereby relegated to the repechage round, where he would be given a second chance to qualify for the semi-finals, and hopefully win an Olympic medal. However, he finished only in fourth place at a time of 7:19.85, which automatically placed him for the non-medal semifinal rounds (group E/F). He progressed into the final E round after finishing third at the semifinal rounds for groups E. In the end, Fraser-Mackenzie came last in the non-medal Final E round with a time of 7:46.49, and finished 30th overall in the men's single sculls.

Personal life
Fraser-Mackenzie is currently an engineering major at Oxford University, and is training with the Oxford University Boat Club, see www.oubc.org.uk and theboatrace.org/men/squad-list

References

External links
 Rowing Profile - James Fraser-Mackenzie

1993 births
Zimbabwean people of British descent
White Zimbabwean sportspeople
Zimbabwean male rowers
Rowers at the 2012 Summer Olympics
Olympic rowers of Zimbabwe
Sportspeople from Harare
Living people